Lincoln Township is an inactive township in Lawrence County, in the U.S. state of Missouri.

Lincoln Township has the name of President Abraham Lincoln.

References

Townships in Missouri
Townships in Lawrence County, Missouri